Gopinath Puzhankara is an Indian judge who is presently serving as a judge of Kerala High Court. The High Court of Kerala is the highest court in the Indian state of Kerala and in the Union Territory of Lakshadweep. The High Court of Kerala is headquartered at Ernakulam, Kochi. The court of justice Gopinath was one among the three paperless courts started functioning from 01 August, 2022 in Kerala High Court.

Education
Gopinath obtained law degree from the Government Law College, Ernakulam securing 1st rank in the final examination and completed masters in Law from University of Cambridge, United Kingdom with Cambridge Commonwealth Trust Scholarship for undertaking post graduate study at the University of Cambridge.

Career
Gopinath enrolled in 1996 and started practicing as a lawyer. During his practice he served as Central Government Counsel and Senior Standing Counsel for the Central Board of Excise and Customs. In 2018 he was designated as Senior Advocate by Kerala High Court. 6 March 2020 he was appointed as additional judge of Kerala High Court and became permanent with effect from 28.05.2021.

References

External links
 High Court of Kerala

Living people
Judges of the Kerala High Court
21st-century Indian judges
Indian judges
1972 births